George Molyneux (24 July 1875 – 14 April 1942) was a professional footballer who played for Everton, Southampton and Southend United, and later became Southend's manager.

He played in the 1902 FA Cup Final for Southampton, and won four England caps.

Honours
Southampton
 FA Cup finalist: 1902

References

External links

Everton career summary
Full career details

1875 births
1942 deaths
Footballers from Liverpool
English footballers
Association football fullbacks
England international footballers
English Football League players
Southern Football League players
Everton F.C. players
Southampton F.C. players
Portsmouth F.C. players
Southend United F.C. players
Colchester Town F.C. players
Southend United F.C. managers
Wigan County F.C. players
FA Cup Final players